N. Nanjappan is an Indian politician and was elected to the Tamil Nadu Legislative Assembly from the Pennagaram constituency in 2011. He represents the Communist Party of India party.

References 

Members of the Tamil Nadu Legislative Assembly
Communist Party of India politicians from Tamil Nadu
Living people
Year of birth missing (living people)
Tamil Nadu MLAs 2011–2016